Pabstiella uniflora is a species of orchid plant native to Ecuador.

References 

uniflora
Flora of Ecuador